Erinaceusyllis cirripapillata is a species belonging to the phylum Annelida, a group known as the segmented worms. E. cirripapillata is characterized by its papillae on its dorsal cirri, one of them being distinctively mushroom-shaped. No species of this genus or Sphaerosyllisis is known to possess this particular kind of papillae. The name of the species refers to these same papillae.

Description
Its prostomium is rectangular, showing 4 large eyes in a linear arrangement, as well as 2 anterior eyespots. Its median antenna about the same length as the prostomium and palps put together, while its lateral antennae are shorter. The palps are shorter in length to the prostomium, being fused along their length, and containing a distal notch with few small papillae.

Its peristomium is shorter than the segments that succeed it, being bilobed. Its tentacular cirri and antennae are alike, but smaller, the dorsal cirri shorter than the antennae but longer than the former, being absent on chaetiger 2. Its antennae and cirri possess small papillae and 1 or 2 mushroom-shaped papillae.

Its parapodia are rectangular to conical and also possess papillae, similar to those on the dorsal cirri. It shows short and straight spines on blades within its heteromorphic compound chaetae. The blades are elongate and unidentate, slightly hooked at the ends. Its anterior parapodia count with 6 to 7 compound chaetae with dorsoventral gradation in length, from 28 to 12µm. Its posterior parapodia amount to 6 and are slender than the anterior ones. Erinaceusyllis cirripapillata shows simple and unidentate, dorsal chaetae from chaetiger 7, showing marginal spines; its ventral simple chaetae are slender and smooth, present on the posterior parapodia. Its acicula is solitary and acuminate.

The pharynx is slender, spanning 3 segments. Its pharyngeal tooth is located on the opening of the pharynx. Its proventricle is barrel-shaped, long and wide (spanning 3 segments), with about 26 muscle cell rows. Its pygidium is small, with no cirri and numerous papillae.

Distribution
Erinaceusyllis cirripapillata was first isolated (at a depth of ) from mud in shallow water in North Creek Canal, Richmond River, in New South Wales, and is thought to inhabit an extended area in Queensland.

References

Further reading

External links
WORMS entry

Syllidae
Animals described in 2005